Tihamah or Tihama refers to the Red Sea coastal plain of the Arabian Peninsula from the Gulf of Aqaba to the Bab el Mandeb.

Etymology
Tihāmat is the Proto-Semitic language's term for 'sea'. Tiamat (or Tehom, in masculine form) was the ancient Mesopotamian god of the sea and of chaos. The word appears in the Hebrew Bible as təhōm (Genesis 1:2), meaning "primordial ocean, abyss".

History

Era of Muhammad

During the era of the Islamic prophet Muhammad, many military expeditions took place here including the Battle of Hamra al-Asad and caravan raids. Beginning in January 623 CE, some of the Muslims resorted to the tradition of raiding the Meccan caravans that traveled along the eastern coast of the Red Sea from Mecca to the Syrian region. 

While at Ḥamra' al-Asad, Muhammad made an agreement with Mabad al-Khuzaah at Tihamah, in which Mabad pledged not to conceal anything from him. Mabad was then sent to Mecca to dissuade Abu Sufyan ibn Harb from fighting. In Mecca, Mabad met with Abu Sufyan and exaggerated that Muhammad had gathered a great force to fight Abu Sufyan. Abu Sufyan and his companions were planning a massive and decisive attack on Medina to finish off the Muslims once and for all. Hearing Mabad's talk of the great military strength of Muhammad, Abu Sufyan retreated from his plan of an immediate attack on the Muslims. In this fashion Muhammad successfully managed to prevent the massive onslaught the Meccans were planning.

Geography

The region is sometimes subdivided into two parts, Tihāmat Al-Ḥijaz (northern part) and Tihāmat ʿAsīr (southern part). The Yemeni part is an extension of Tihamat ʿAsir. The plain is constricted and attains its greatest widths south of Medina and Mecca. The cities of Yanbu, Jeddah and Al Qunfudhah are located in the Hijazi part of the Tihamah. The Asiri-Yemeni part of the Tihami plain includes the cities of Jizan and Al Hudaydah. The temperatures in Tihamah are probably some of the hottest on earth. Tihamah in Arabic means severe heat and lack of wind.

Flora

The extensive sandy coastal plain (the Tihamah) is a hot and inhospitable area parallel to the Red Sea, and most of it, north of Zabid (Yemen), is devoid of trees. However, in a few places there is dense shrub composed almost exclusively of Acacia ehrenbergiana and it may be assumed that this was originally the dominant natural vegetation of the Tihamah. Salvadora persica occurs in thickets, and there are odd trees of Balanites aegyptiaca and colonies of wild doum palm (Hyphaene thebaica), as well as planted date palms (Phoenix dactylifera).

Archaeology
Over sixteen megalithic menhirs were discovered by Edward Keall, director of the Royal Ontario Museum's Canadian Archaeological Mission near the village of Al-Mutaynah in the Tihami area. Copper tools suggested to date to the same era as the construction of the stones were dated to around 2400 to 1800 BCE. An even more archaic lithic industry was found along with pottery sherds that were dated between 1200 and 800 BCE.

See also
 Al Harrah, Saudi Arabia
 Idrisid Emirate of Asir
 Kingdom of Hejaz
 List of battles of Muhammad
 Najahids
 Najd
 Rasulids
 Sulaymanids
 Sarat Mountains
 'Asir Mountains
 Fifa Mountains
 Hijaz Mountains
 Midian Mountains

References

Further reading

External links

Megalithic monuments in the Middle East
Geography of Saudi Arabia
Landforms of Saudi Arabia
Plains of Asia
Historical regions in Saudi Arabia
Historical regions
Tiamat